Query by Example (QBE) is a database query language for relational databases. It was devised by Moshé M. Zloof at IBM Research during the mid-1970s, in parallel to the development of SQL. It is the first graphical query language, using visual tables where the user would enter commands, example elements and conditions. Many graphical front-ends for databases use the ideas from QBE today. Originally limited only for the purpose of retrieving data, QBE was later extended to allow other operations, such as inserts, deletes and updates, as well as creation of temporary tables.

The motivation behind QBE is that a parser can convert the user's actions into statements expressed in a database manipulation language, such as SQL.  Behind the scenes, it is this statement that is actually executed. A suitably comprehensive front-end can minimize the burden on the user to remember the finer details of SQL, and it is easier and more productive for end-users (and even programmers) to select tables and columns by selecting them rather than typing in their names.

In the context of information retrieval, QBE has a somewhat different meaning. The user can submit a document, or several documents, and ask for "similar" documents to be retrieved from a document database [see search by multiple examples]. Similarity search is based comparing document vectors (see Vector Space Model).

QBE represents seminal work in end-user development, frequently cited in research papers as an early example of this topic.

Currently, QBE is supported in several relational database front ends, notably Microsoft Access, which implements "Visual Query by Example", as well as Microsoft SQL Server Enterprise Manager. It is also implemented in several object-oriented databases (e.g. in db4o).

QBE is based on the logical formalism called tableau query, although QBE adds some extensions to that, much like SQL is based on the relational algebra.

Example 
An example using the Suppliers and Parts database is given here to illustrate how QBE works.

As a general technique 
The term also refers to a general technique influenced by Zloof's work whereby only items with search values are used to "filter" the results. It provides a way for a software user to perform queries without having to know a query language (such as SQL). The software can automatically generate the queries for the user (usually behind the scenes). Here are some examples:

Example Form B:
 .....Name: Bob
 ..Address:
 .....City:
 ....State: TX
 ..Zipcode:

Resulting SQL:
SELECT * FROM Contacts WHERE Name='Bob' AND State='TX';
Note how blank  items do not generate SQL terms. Since "Address" is blank, there is no clause generated for it.
For
Example Form C:
 .....Name: 
 ..Address:
 .....City: Sampleton
 ....State: 
 ..Zipcode: 12345

Resulting SQL:
SELECT * FROM Contacts WHERE City='Sampleton' AND Zipcode='12345';
More advanced versions of QBE have other comparison operator options, often via a pull-down menu, such as "Contains", "Not Contains", "Starts With", "Greater-Than", and so forth.

Another approach to text comparisons is to allow one or more wildcard character characters. For example, if an asterisk is designated as a wild wildcard character in a particular system, then searching for last names using "Rob*" would return (match) last names such as "Rob", "Robert", "Robertson", "Roberto", etc.

See also 
CRUD
Microsoft Query by Example
 GraphQL a QBE for JSON front-ends.
 QBIC

References

Sources 

 .
 .
 .
 .
 .

External links 
 
 

Relational model
Query languages
Human–computer interaction
1970s software
IBM software